Sky FM is a privately owned radio station in Sunyani, the capital of Bono Region in Ghana. Sky Broadcasting Limited owns and runs the station. The station was adjudged the Best Morning Show (English) category in the maiden edition of the B/A GJA Awards ceremony in Ghana. The station broadcasts in traditional FM stereo.

References 

Radio stations in Ghana
Mass media in Sunyani